BYO or byo may stand for:

 BYO Records
 IATA code Bonito Airport
 BYOB, a reference to "bring your own" alcohol
 Byo river in the Central African Republic